General Sir Hesperus Andrias van Ryneveld,  (2 May 1891 – 2 December 1972), known as Sir Pierre van Ryneveld, was a South African military commander. He was the founding commander of the South African Air Force.

Military career

Van Ryneveld began his military career in the First World War, in which he served in the Royal Flying Corps and later the Royal Air Force. For his service in the war, Van Ryneveld was awarded the Distinguished Service Order and Military Cross, Mentioned in Despatches, and presented with the Chevalier of the Legion of Honour from the French government.

After the war, Van Ryneveld was called back to South Africa by the Prime Minister Jan Smuts in order to set up the South African Air Force (SAAF). He flew back home, across Africa, in a Vickers Vimy – a pioneering feat for which he and his co-pilot Quintin Brand were both knighted.

Colonel van Ryneveld established the SAAF in 1920, and directed it until 1933, when he was promoted to Chief of the General Staff (CGS), in command of the Union Defence Forces. However, for the next four years the SAAF remained under Van Ryneveld's direct control as no one was appointed as the Air Force's director until 1937.

Van Ryneveld served as CGS for sixteen years, including the whole of the Second World War. He retired in 1949.

Namesakes and legacy

The Pretoria suburb of Pierre van Ryneveld Park was named in his honour and the airport just north of Upington in the Northern Cape is also named after Van Ryneveld.  Sir Pierre van Ryneveld High School is in Kempton Park, Gauteng. The SAAF's annual air power symposium, is known as the Sir Pierre Van Ryneveld Air Power Symposium.

References

External links
 
South African Air Force Museum – General Sir Helperus Andreas (Pierre) Van Ryneveld
Prominent People – van Ryneveld, Pierre

|-

|-

|-

1891 births
1972 deaths
Royal Flying Corps officers
South African military personnel of World War II
South African Air Force generals
South African knights
Royal Air Force officers
South African Air Force personnel
Recipients of the Military Cross
Companions of the Distinguished Service Order
South African Knights Commander of the Order of the British Empire
Companions of the Order of the Bath
Alumni of Grey College, Bloemfontein
Afrikaner people
South African people of Dutch descent
Chevaliers of the Légion d'honneur